Communist Cambodia may refer to:

 Democratic Kampuchea, Cambodia under the rule of Khmer Rouge from 1975 to 1979, existed from 1975 until 1982
 Coalition Government of Democratic Kampuchea, rump state of Khmer Rouge from 1982 to 1992
 People's Republic of Kampuchea, installed by Vietnam after defeating the Khmer Rouge from 1979 to 1989